Brymaroo is a rural locality in the Toowoomba Region, Queensland, Australia. In the  Brymaroo had a population of 140 people.

It includes the location of the World War II era Brymaroo Aerodrome and current Army Aviation practice area.

History 
The locality was originally called Rosalie (possibly after the parish name) but was renamed Byrmaroo on 1 July 1905 to avoid confusion with other places called Rosalie.

Rosalie Plains Provisional School opened in 1881 as a half-time school with Irvingdale Provisional School (meaning they shared a single teacher) but closed on 6 May 1881. On 1 May 1882 it re-opened as a full-time provisional school but closed on 2 May 1883. It opened again in April 1889 in a new building, but then closed in April 1906. It re-opened on 29 August 1913 and on 14 July 1914 it was renamed Brymaroo State School. It closed in 1927, but on 11 Jun 1928 it reopened as a half-time school in conjunction with Viewfield State School. On 1 April 1930 Brymaroo State School returned to being a full-time school. It closed permanently on 16 Apr 1944.

St Lambert's Anglican Church was dedicated on 17 November 1911. Its closure on 25 June 1995 was approved by Assistant Bishop Wood.

During World War II, the Royal Australian Air Force established the Brymaroo Aerodrome via compulsory acquisition.

In the  Brymaroo had a population of 140 people.

Road infrastructure
The Pechey-Maclagan Road runs through from east to north. The Jondaryan-Nungil Road runs south from the centre, and the Brymaroo-Irvingdale Road runs west.

Brymaroo Aerodrome 
Brymaroo ICAO: YBYO is a military-only satellite site located 22 kilometres from the Army Aviation base at Oakey, Queensland.

On 1 December 2018 the Australian Department of Defence issued an advisory document

References 

Toowoomba Region
Localities in Queensland